Cuxhaven – Stade II is an electoral constituency (German: Wahlkreis) represented in the Bundestag. It elects one member via first-past-the-post voting. Under the current constituency numbering system, it is designated as constituency 29. It is located in northern Lower Saxony, comprising the Cuxhaven district and the northern part of the Stade district.

Cuxhaven – Stade II was created for the 2009 federal election. Since 2021, it has been represented by Daniel Schneider of the Social Democratic Party (SPD).

Geography
Cuxhaven – Stade II is located in northern Lower Saxony. As of the 2021 federal election, it comprises the entirety of the district of Cuxhaven and the northern part of the district of Stade, specifically the municipality of Drochtersen and the Samtgemeinden of Nordkehdingen and Oldendorf-Himmelpforten.

History
Cuxhaven – Stade II was created in 2009 and contained parts of the abolished constituencies of Cuxhaven – Osterholz and Stade – Cuxhaven. In the 2009 election, it was constituency 30 in the numbering system. Since the 2013 election, it has been constituency 29. Its borders have not changed since its creation.

Members
The constituency was first held by Enak Ferlemann of the Christian Democratic Union (CDU) from 2009 to 2021. Daniel Schneider won it for the Social Democratic Party (SPD) in 2021.

Election results

2021 election

2017 election

2013 election

2009 election

References

Federal electoral districts in Lower Saxony
2009 establishments in Germany
Constituencies established in 2009